The Church and Monastery of St Peter is a Catholic Benedictine monastery for Cloistered nuns located in the medieval city of Mdina, Malta. The adjacent church is dedicated to St Peter and St Benedict.

History
It is not known when the monastery was founded however it is known that the first nuns in Malta arrived in the early 15th century. Thus the monastery of St Peter was established sometime around 1418. In 1555 Bishop Cubelles of Malta mentions that the chapel of the monastery was endowed with gold and silver and all the necessarily objects required for worship. The present church as seen today was renovated around 1625 through the initiatives of Bishop Baldassare Cagliares.

Interior of the church
The altarpiece, dating from 1682, depicts the Madonna and child with Saint Peter, St Benedict and St Scholastica. It is the work of Mattia Preti. Other works depict the Resurrection of Jesus and Our Lady of the Pillar, the work of Francesco Zahra. The chapel also includes the remains of Blessed Maria Adeodata Pisani who was a cloistered nun who lived in the monastery in the middle of the 19th century. Blessed Maria Adeodata was beatified by Pope John Paul II in 2001.

References

17th-century Roman Catholic church buildings in Malta
Mdina
National Inventory of the Cultural Property of the Maltese Islands